Gu Won (Korean: 구원; born 5 February 1988) is a South Korean actor and model.  He is best known for his roles in television dramas and movies such as Fists of Legend (2013), Enemies from the Past (2017), Legal High (2019), Discovery of Love (2014), Love with Flaws (2019).

Biography and career
He studied film and drama at Chung Ang University and made his acting debut in the drama series Cheongdam-dong Alice in 2012.  The following year he made his big-screen debut in the film Fists of Legend.  He followed up with a role in the movie The Youth in 2014.  More recently, he has appeared in drama series titles Legal High (2019) and Love with Flaws (2019).

Filmography

Television

Film

Books
 What I Have (Poems)

References

External links 
 
 
 

1988 births
Living people
21st-century South Korean male actors
South Korean male models
South Korean male television actors
South Korean male film actors